Chris Guccione and André Sá were the defending champions, but chose not to participate this year.

Dominic Inglot and Daniel Nestor won the title defeating Ivan Dodig and Marcelo Melo in the final, 7–5, 7–6(7–4).

Seeds

Draw

Draw

References
 Main Draw

Nottingham Open - Men's Doubles
2016 Doubles